The Cape thread snake (Leptotyphlops conjunctus) is a species of snake in the family Leptotyphlopidae. It has previously been considered a subspecies of Peter's thread snake, Leptotyphlops scutifrons. It was first described in 1861 as Stenostoma conjunctum.

Gallery

References

External Links
 iNaturalist page

Leptotyphlops
Reptiles described in 1861